Arenas de Iguña is a municipality located in the autonomous community of Cantabria, Spain. According to the 2007 census, the city has a population of 1,927 inhabitants.

Towns
Arenas de Iguña (Capital)
Bostronizo
Cohiño
Las Fraguas
Los Llares
Palacio
Pedredo
San Cristóbal
San Juan de Raicedo
San Vicente de León
Santa Águeda
La Serna de Iguña

References

External links

Municipalities in Cantabria